Princess Saljan is a character in the Book of Dede Korkut and other Turkic mythology. The character of Saljan has also been adapted as 'Selcan Hatun' in the Turkish TV series Diriliş: Ertuğrul and Kuruluş: Osman in a similar manner to Bamsi Beyrek.

In the Book of Dede Korkut

"" is considered the most romantic story in Korkut Ata's book. Kanli Koja eagerly attempts to marry his son off immediately, but his son has very high standards for a wife:Before I rise to my feet she must rise; before I mount my well-trained horse she must be on horseback; before I reach the bloody infidels' land she must already have got there and brought back a few heads.

Kan Turali then finds a girl who he thinks meets his standards, Saljan, although her father was the infidel king of Trebizond. Kan Turali rides off to the Byzantine castle, where he has to face all sorts of challenges including having to kill a lion, a bull, and a savage black camel to win the hand of the king's daughter Princess Saljan. After refusing to enter the bridal's tent before receiving his parents' blessing, Kan Turali heads for the land of the Oghuz with his betrothed. After regretting to give his daughter to Kan Turali, the king of Trebizond sends an army to kill the couple. Caught off guard, Kan Turali is nearly about to die in the fight and Princess Saljan saves him, as while Kan Turali sleeps, Saljan realises that other potential suitors for her may come and kill Kan Turali. Therefore, she takes Turali's horse and dons his armour and spear, and takes a high ground to be on the lookout for enemies. Saljan eventually wakes up Kan Turali after her father's soldiers arrive, saying: Wake up! Raise your head, O warrior!
The foe has come, the enemy is here!
Why do you sleep? Arise, warrior!
My part was to rouse you; yours, to fight and show your skill.

Saljan fights off her father's soldiers and saves Turali's life. This leaves Kan Turali furious as he has been saved by a woman. He threatens to kill her, whereupon she promises not to boast about saving him, but still, he is furious. Annoyed, she asks if they could handle the matter with their bows. She shoots first and fails to kill him because she failed to remove her finger from the arrow that she was holding. The couple embraces and reconciles after they now learn that they truly love each other and it is impossible for either of them to kill each other. Returning to the Oghuz lands, away from the infidels, they hold a grand wedding feast where Dede Korkut sings the sixth legend (this story).

TV adaptation
This section documents her adaptation into Diriliş: Ertuğrul and Kuruluş: Osman, where she is known as 'Selcan Hatun'. All information relating to Selcan's husband Gündoğdu and sister Gökçe is also documented here.

Background
Selcan Hatun was shown in Diriliş: Ertuğrul as the orphaned daughter of Alptekin Bey, who was killed by Süleyman Şah as a punishment for a failed revolt. She, along with her younger sister, Gökçe Hatun, were then adopted and raised by Süleyman Şah and his wife, Hayme Hatun, alongside their children, Gündoğdu, Sungurtekin, Ertuğrul and Dundar. Selcan was later married to Suleyman Sah's eldest son, Gündoğdu Bey.

Season 1
 

Despite Süleyman Şah wedding her to his son, Gündoğdu, Selcan still bore a hatred for her adoptive father and sought to avenge her biological father, Alptekin, often seeing him in visions. She had an immediate dislike towards Halime Sultan, a Selçuk princess, upon her arrival at the tribe. She sought to marry her sister Gökçe to Ertuğrul to boost her influence in the tribe, manipulating Gökçe's unrequited love for Ertuğrul. Seeking to make her husband Gündoğdu the Bey of the Kayı tribe, she allied with Kurdoğlu Bey, Süleyman Şah's adoptive brother and a traitor who was working with the Templars. She also aborted her conceived baby and slandered Aykız Hatun with responsibility. Later, Gündoğdu tricked Kurdoğlu and secured his father's re-election as the Bey, which initially angered Selcan, but later caused her to repent for her sins with the help of İbn-i Arabi. Selcan asked for forgiveness from Aykız, Halime and the rest of her family for her sins. Selcan and Halime then grow close and view one another as sisters. Meanwhile, Gökçe was wounded and rendered infertile indirectly through Kurdoğlu after saving Ertuğrul's life. Gökçe then blamed Selcan for this as she collaborated with Kurdoğlu before her redemption. Gündoğdu was also angered with Selcan for a period of time after she revealed her sins. Gökçe eventually asked Süleyman Şah to end her engagement with Ertuğrul as she realised he was in love with Halime. Eventually, Selcan was forgiven by her family for her sins and conceived another child. Towards the end of the season, Kurdoğlu was beheaded, with the then pregnant Selcan being wounded by Komutan Titus but later recovered. Gündoğdu later beheaded Titus for revenge, with the help of Ertuğrul.

Season 2

The Kayı took refuge with the Dodurga tribe after a Mongol attack, in which half the tribe, including Aykız, were killed. Selcan, having had three miscarriages, faced the devious Aytolun Hatun of the Dodurga tribe. However, Selcan failed to prove Aytolun's evil to her family, and was ostracised by Gündoğdu and Gökçe, who think she was still evil. Aytolun's step-son Tuğtekin eventually fell in love with Gökçe, despite her still loving Ertuğrul. Gökçe therefore became more jealous of Halime, and sought to use Tuğtekin to take revenge on Ertuğrul and Halime, which Selcan scolded her for. After Selcan was kidnapped by Baycu Noyan, she was rescued by Gündoğdu, who had been named Alpbaşı (Chief Alp). Meanwhile, Selcan dealt with the arrival of Aytolun's niece, Goncagül Hatun, who fell in love with and was engaged to Gündoğdu. However, with the help of Halime, Banu Çiçek and Ertuğrul, Selcan eventually proved Aytolun and Goncagül's evil to her family. Aytolun and Goncagül were later killed after attacking Selcan, Gökçe and Halime, whilst Tuğtekin married Gökçe after Gökçe grows to love him, although they have a tense relationship due to Gökçe's infertility and previous love for Ertuğrul. Eventually, Gökçe, along with her husband Tuğtekin, are martyred by Baycu Noyan, devastating Selcan. At the end of the season, Selcan became pregnant again, whilst the Kayi Tribe split between the feuding half-brothers Gündoğdu and Ertuğrul. Selcan stays with Gündoğdu in Erzurum, whilst Ertuğrul, Halime, Hayme Ana and Banu Çiçek leave for Bithynia.

Season 5 and Kuruluş: Osman

Following her tribe being ravaged by the Mongols and the devious Beybolat Bey, disguised as 'Albastı', she, Gündoğdu and their son Süleyman, along with their branch of the Kayı tribe, took refuge in Ertuğrul's tribe. She has tense relations upon her arrival with Hafsa Hatun, the wife of Bamsi Bey, who had been managing the tribe after Halime Sultan's death. Hafsa was misled by Sirma Hatun, Beybolat's sister. Eventually, her issues with Hafsa were resolved, whilst Sırma was killed. She was devastated upon the martyrdom of her son Süleyman by Beybolat. However, Süleyman was later avenged by Ertuğrul and Gündoğdu. After her son's death, Selcan grew close with Ertugrul's sons, particularly Osman who craved a mother's love and they in turn viewed Selcan as a mother. Gündoğdu and Selcan later returned to their branch of the tribe in Ahlat after receiving news of their son, İltekin, being wounded.

In Kuruluş: Osman, after Gündoğdu was martyred offscreen by Mongols, Selcan returned to Ertuğrul's branch of the tribe, where she was treated as a mother by Ertuğrul's sons Gündüz and Osman following the prior death of Halime and became the Hanim of the tribe, as the elder sister of Ertuğrul. She also faceed the devious Zöhre Hatun, wife of Selcan's adoptive brother, Dundar Bey, and became a mother figure to Bala Hatun, Osman's wife. After Zöhre was killed, Selcan was treated as a mother by Dündar and Zöhre's daughter Aygül, who she trained to become an alp, and Gonca Hatun, Bala's best friend and the wife of Osman's loyal alp - Boran Alp. She was devastated upon the death of Ertuğrul, and supported Osman in becoming the Bey. She guided and advised Bala, who succeeds her as Hanim of the tribe upon Osman's appointment as Bey. Selcan was eventually sent by the new Bey, Osman, to convince her branch of the Kayı tribe to migrate to Söğüt and reunify.

Selcan returned and continued to support Osman and his wives, Bala Hatun and Malhun Hatun, in their roles as well as being a guiding figure for the other women. She gave permission for Cerkutay to marry Aygul. Selcan was targeted by the Seljuk Vizier, Alamshah, who wanted to kill her as she was a big supporting factor for Osman. However, his plan failed and he was eventually executed by Osman. She helped deliver Osman and Bala's son, Alaeddin Ali, who was born prematurely.

Several years had passed and as Selcan's age increased, her health also deterioted. She began coughing blood and hid the true extent of her illness from her family, except her adoptive daughter-in-law, Ayse Hatun. She had realised her days were numbered. On the day Osman and the Kayi tribe returned victorious after conquering Bilicek Castle, Selcan Hatun died surrounded by her family and tribe, in the arms of Osman. In her last breaths, she makes Orhan and Alaeddin promise that they will always support one another, expresses her happiness that she will be reunited with Gundogdu again and that she will see everyone in the afterlife by the pond of abundance before reciting the shahadah and passing away - leaving behind her family and tribe who were all devastated by her loss.

Appearance and other information
After Selcan was sent to the other branch of the tribe by Osman Bey in order to reunify the Kayı, she was not expected to appear again in season 2. Selcan had temporarily left the series as the actress portraying Selcan, Didem Balçin, was actually temporarily leaving the show to allow for her pregnancy.

Reception
Diriliş: Ertuğrul has been well received in Pakistan. Didem Balçın, who plays the role of Selcan Hatun, signed a contract with Pakistani designer brand Maria B as a model for their winter collection. In 2017, she was also nominated for the Turkey Youth Awards in the category Best TV Actress. Kaan Taşaner, the actor who plays Selcan's husband Gündoğdu Bey, was also cast as the twins 'Markus' and 'Mitras' in the Turkish TV series Uyanış: Büyük Selçuklu following his popularity from his role in Diriliş: Ertuğrul.

Burcu Kıratlı, the actress who plays the role of Selcan's sister Gökçe Hatun, partnered with Pakistani designer brand Ali Xeeshan Theater Studios following her popularity from Diriliş: Ertuğrul, modelling a designer Pakistani bridal dress in a viral photoshoot. Kıratlı was also noted in Pakistani media for her second marriage with the Turkish singer Sinan Akçıl. In October 2020, Kıratlı was noted in Pakistani media for winning the Turkish 'Those Who Carried Turkish Cinema From the Past to the Future' award for services to Turkish cinema. However, following the release of the series, Kıratlı has also received negative attention for her pictures on social media, which have been perceived as 'immodest', in a similar manner to her co-star Esra Bilgiç, the actress who played Halime Hatun.

See also
List of Diriliş: Ertuğrul characters
List of Kuruluş: Osman characters

Notes

References 

Characters in the Book of Dede Korkut